Mi Sandi (born 12 June 1990) is a Myanmar hip-hop singer of Mon descent.

Early life and education 
Mi Sandi was born on 8 June 1990 in Yangon, Myanmar. She graduated from International Management College in 2010 with a Bachelor of Business Management (BBM). She received a diploma in Accounting and Management Accounting from LCCI in 2011 and a Master of Business Management (MBA) in 2014.

Career 
She gained popularity with the song "Frozen Smile" (ရေခဲရိုက်အပြုံး), which she performed alongside G Fatt in 2017. The crossover between the two fan bases was hugely successful.

In 2013, she released the song "Ma Nyo Nyin Yat Bu", featuring singer Yair Yint Aung.

On 27 September 2017, energy drink M-150. Official page on Mi Sandi G Fatt ; Song MTV. After one hour, there were more than 20,000 shares and over 500,000 views. Today there are over 1.8 million views.

Honours and awards 
Special Music Award of the Monsoon, 2014
The Best Selling Studio Music Album, Female Vocalist of the Year, 2018 (City FM).

Discography

Solo albums 
Monopoly (2013)
Pyit Daing Htaung (2014)
Little Heart (2017)
Frozen Courage (2019)

Single albums 
With Much Love (2015)
Little Pillow (2016)
Brainless Dummy (2018)
Fearing the Rain (2018)
Empty Pocket (2018)
High-5 (2018)
I Would (2019)
Competition is Intensifying (2019)
Do it All Again (2019)
Falling Hard (2019)
A Thae Kwal A Pay A Tay (2019)

References

External links 

1990 births
Living people
Burmese people of Mon descent
Burmese female models
Burmese women rappers
21st-century Burmese women singers
Burmese film actresses
Burmese singer-songwriters
Burmese Theravada Buddhists
People from Yangon